The Camden County School District is the public school district in Camden County, Georgia, United States, based in Kingsland, Georgia. It serves the communities of Hopewell, Kings Bay, Kings Bay Base, Kingsland, Spring Bluff, St. Marys, Waverly and Woodbine, Georgia.

Schools
The Camden County School District has two early childhood programs, nine elementary schools, two middle schools, and one high school.

Early Childhood programs 
Pre-K Program
Extended Day Care

Elementary schools
Crooked River Elementary School
David L. Rainer Elementary School
Kingsland Elementary School
Mamie Lou Gross Elementary School
Mary Lee Clark Elementary School
Matilda Harris Elementary School
St. Marys Elementary School
Sugarmill Elementary School
Woodbine Elementary School

Middle schools
Camden County Middle School
St. Marys Middle School

High school
Camden County High School
CCHS Ninth Grade Center

Private school
Coastal Academy

Controversy
In February 2021 Camden County Middle School attracted controversy after an eleven year old non-binary student was assaulted. The school has been accused of failing in their duty to prevent bullying, misgendering the student and not fully investigating the incident.

References

External links

School districts in Georgia (U.S. state)
Education in Camden County, Georgia